Katharine Sarah Rogers (born 21 December 1960) is a British television actress.

Rogers was born in Addiscombe, Croydon, London.  Her first major television role was that of firefighter Josie Ingham in three series of London's Burning. She has since appeared in numerous well-known British television shows, including EastEnders, Doctors, Casualty, Merseybeat, The Bill and Heartbeat.

External links

1960 births
Living people
English television actresses
Actresses from London
People from Addiscombe
People from Croydon
20th-century English actresses
21st-century English actresses